HD 37124 c is an extrasolar planet approximately 103 light-years away in the constellation of Taurus.  The planet was discovered in 2002 orbiting the star HD 37124. The planet is most likely to be a gas giant (based on its mass).

References

External links
 
 

Taurus (constellation)
Exoplanets discovered in 2002
Giant planets
Exoplanets detected by radial velocity
Giant planets in the habitable zone

es:HD 37124#Sistema planetario
it:HD 37124#Prospetto